The Sault Ste. Marie International Bridge spans the St. Marys River between the United States and Canada connecting the twin cities of Sault Ste. Marie, Michigan and Sault Ste. Marie, Ontario. The bridge is operated by the International Bridge Administration under the direction of the Sault Ste. Marie Bridge Authority, a bi-national governing body consisting of four directors appointed by the Governor of Michigan and four appointed by the Canadian government-owned Federal Bridge Corporation.

Description
The Sault Ste. Marie International Bridge is the tenth-busiest passenger crossing on the Canada–United States border, and the only land crossing for almost 700 miles (1125 km). It serves as the northern terminus of Interstate 75 (I-75). The bridge construction began in 1960 and officially opened to traffic on October 31, 1962.  Contractors included Massman Construction Co. of Kansas City, MO and Bethlehem Steel of Bethlehem, PA. Daily operation is carried on by the International Bridge Administration (IBA) under the supervision of the Sault Ste. Marie Bridge Authority (SSMBA). The SSMBA replaced the previous Joint International Bridge Authority (JIBA) in 2009, which in turn had succeeded the International Bridge Authority (IBA, created in 1935) in 2000.

This is a steel truss arch bridge with a suspended deck. There are two separate spans, a double arch span on the U.S. side and a single arch span on the Canadian side. The double arch spans cross the four U.S. Soo Locks. The single arch spans the single Canadian Lock. In Sault Ste. Marie, Ontario, the bridge ends at a city street, Huron Street, in the downtown core. The total length of the bridge approaches . The Bridge allows bicycles to cross, but the lack of dedicated bike lanes requires cyclists to take proper precautions to ensure visibility.

The International Bridge Bus crosses the bridge hourly from 8:00 am to 4:00 pm on weekdays serving both downtown areas and Lake Superior State University on the Michigan side and the Station Mall on the Ontario side.

A tourist information radio station, CIRS, broadcast at 530 AM from the Ontario side of the bridge until 2010.

History

In 1954 the state of Michigan created the International Bridge Authority. Canada followed in 1955, creating the St.Mary's River Co. The bridge was opened in 1962.

Beginning in 1987, an annual International Bridge Walk has been held on the last Saturday in June, starting on the Michigan side, with participants finishing in Ontario.

In 1975, the bridge had its 10 millionth crossing.

On June 6, 2005, the Ontario government announced a construction project to build a dedicated truck bypass route to connect the bridge to Highway 17 in the north end of the city. The city had lobbied for this for some time, since the bridge's terminus at a city street was viewed by many residents of the city as a safety concern; however, the bridge terminus itself cannot be easily relocated due to the already highly urbanized nature of the Sault, Ontario waterfront. The truck route, known as Carmen's Way in memory of the city's former federal MP Carmen Provenzano, was officially opened in September 2006.

Construction work subsequently commenced in 2009 on a project to expand and modernize the Canadian bridge plaza, including a larger Canada Border Services Agency building with improved truck inspection facilities and a dedicated route to take trucks directly to Carmen's Way, thereby eliminating the need for trucking traffic to enter Huron Street.

Beginning in May 2014, construction work commenced on improvements to the plaza on the Michigan side of the bridge. The 100 millionth crossing occurred on March 1, 2018.

Border crossing

The Sault Sainte Marie Border Crossing connects the cities of Sault Ste. Marie, Michigan and Sault Ste. Marie, Ontario at the Sault Ste. Marie International Bridge. The US Port of Entry was established in 1843, as the cities on each shore of the river grew.  Regular ferry service began in 1865, and border inspection services in both the US and Canada were provided at the ferry terminals since the early 1900s. Ferry service abruptly ended in  1962 when the International Bridge spanning the river was completed.  Railroad trains cross the border on the adjacent Sault Ste. Marie International Railroad Bridge which was built in 1887.

See also
 
 
 
 
 List of bridges in Canada

References

External links

International Bridge
International Bridge Photos
Announcement of truck route construction by the Ontario Ministry of Public Infrastructure Renewal
International Bridge Web Cams

Bridges completed in 1962
Bridges on the Interstate Highway System
Buildings and structures in Sault Ste. Marie, Michigan
Buildings and structures in Sault Ste. Marie, Ontario
Canada–United States bridges
Interstate 75
Lake Superior Circle Tour
Lake Huron Circle Tour
Road bridges in Michigan
Road bridges in Ontario
Sault Ste. Marie
St. Marys River (Michigan–Ontario)
Through arch bridges in Canada
Through arch bridges in the United States
Toll bridges in Canada
Toll bridges in Michigan
Tolled sections of Interstate Highways
Transportation in Chippewa County, Michigan
Truss bridges in Canada
Truss bridges in the United States
Steel bridges in the United States
Steel bridges in Canada